Erol Kolcu (born 20 April 1962) is a retired Turkish football defender and later manager.

References

1962 births
Living people
Turkish footballers
Samsunspor footballers
Sakaryaspor footballers
Mersin İdman Yurdu footballers
Alanyaspor footballers
Association football defenders
Turkish football managers
Sakaryaspor managers